David "D. C." Moore (born 1980) is a British playwright and television screenwriter.

Biography
He was raised in Duston, Northamptonshire. Now based in London, he started out as an assistant director and worked with Rupert Goold on productions of The Weir and Waiting for Godot. He was then part of the Royal Court Theatre's Young Writers' Programme. His first play Alaska was produced upstairs at the Royal Court in 2007, and he won the inaugural Tom Erhardt Award for promising new playwright in 2008.

His second play at the Royal Court, The Empire, about young men in the War in Afghanistan, opened in 2010 and received positive reviews. On the strength of that play he was nominated for the 2010 Evening Standard Award for Most Promising Playwright. The play was nominated for the 2010 Olivier Awards in the Outstanding Achievement in an Affiliate Theatre category.

Honest, a 45-minute monologue, was produced by Royal & Derngate in Northampton in 2010 at the Mailcoach pub and also received good reviews. It was then revived at the 2010 Edinburgh Fringe Festival at Milne's Bar as part of the Assembly programme. It is being revived once more for the Edinburgh Fringe in 2014 by Organised Crime Theatre Company at The Space @ Jury's Inn.

Commissioned by Royal & Derngate, Moore's play Town is a contemporary story inspired by local 19th-century poet John Clare's struggle with madness and his walk from London to Northampton.

His play The Swan premiered as part of a double feature in a production staged in the National Theatre's Paintframe, where the sets are usually painted, in 2011.

He has also written for television, contributing episodes of Killing Eve and Temple.

Bibliography
 Alaska (2007): Jerwood Theatre Upstairs, Royal Court Theatre
 The Empire (2010): Jerwood Theatre Upstairs, Royal Court Theatre
 Honest (2010): Mailcoach Pub (Northampton)
 Town (2010): Royal Theatre (Northampton)
 The Swan (2011): The Paintframe, National Theatre
 Straight (2012): Sheffield Crucible and Bush Theatre
 Another Place (2014): Theatre Royal, Plymouth
 Common (2017): National Theatre, London

References

External links

Living people
1980 births
21st-century English male writers
British male screenwriters
British television writers
English dramatists and playwrights
English male dramatists and playwrights
British male television writers
People from West Northamptonshire District
21st-century British screenwriters